Jason Kenneth Vander Laan (born September 22, 1992) is a former American football tight end and current offensive coordinator for Rockford High School. He played college football as a quarterback at Ferris State. Vander Laan was signed by the New York Jets as an undrafted free agent in 2016.

College career
At Ferris State, Vander Laan set the NCAA all-divisions record for career rushing yards by a quarterback with 5,953.  He also set the NCAA Division II record for rushing yards in a single season by a quarterback (1,607 in 2013). Also, at Ferris State he won 2 Harlon Hill Trophies, which is awarded to the best player in all of NCAA Division II.

Legacy
On October 22, 2022, Vander Laan's No. 15 was retired by the Bulldogs.

College statistics

Professional career

New York Jets
Vander Laan was signed by the Jets as an undrafted free agent on May 5, 2016. With the Jets, he converted from a quarterback to a tight end. He was released by the team on August 28, 2016. He was re-signed to the practice squad on December 20, 2016. He signed a reserve/future contract with the Jets on January 2, 2017. He was waived by the Jets on September 3, 2017.

Indianapolis Colts
On November 3, 2017, Vander Laan was signed to the Indianapolis Colts' practice squad. He was promoted to the active roster on November 25, 2017. He was waived by the Colts on May 7, 2018.

Carolina Panthers
On May 21, 2018, Vander Laan signed with the Carolina Panthers. He was waived on September 1, 2018 and signed to the practice squad the next day. He was promoted to the active roster on December 19, 2018.

Vander Laan was waived during final roster cuts on August 30, 2019.

New England Patriots
On September 25, 2019, Vander Laan signed with the New England Patriots practice squad. On October 15, 2019, he was released.

New Orleans Saints
On October 23, 2019, Vander Laan was signed to the New Orleans Saints practice squad. He was promoted to the active roster on November 22, 2019. He was placed on injured reserve on December 6, 2019 with a head injury.

Vander Laan chose to opt-out of the 2020 season due to the COVID-19 pandemic on July 28, 2020. He was waived after the season on February 12, 2021.

Coaching career
On March 10, 2021, Vander Laan was hired by Rockford High School as an offensive coordinator.

References

External links
Ferris State Bulldogs bio

1992 births
Living people
American football quarterbacks
American football tight ends
Carolina Panthers players
Ferris State Bulldogs football players
Indianapolis Colts players
New England Patriots players
New Orleans Saints players
New York Jets players
People from Frankfort, Illinois
Players of American football from Illinois
Sportspeople from Cook County, Illinois